Coleophora accordella is a moth of the family Coleophoridae. It is found in the United States, including California and Utah.

The larvae feed on the leaves of Hedysarum and Lotus species. They create a lobe case.

References

accordella
Moths described in 1882
Moths of North America